The  is a botanical garden located in the Aoshima neighborhood of the city of Miyazaki, Miyazaki Prefecture, Japan, near the island of Aoshima.

The garden contains 400 species of subtropical plants.

See also 
 List of botanical gardens in Japan
List of Special Places of Scenic Beauty, Special Historic Sites and Special Natural Monuments

External links 
 Aoshima Subtropical Botanical Garden (Japanese)
 Japan National Tourist Organization entry

Botanical gardens in Japan
Miyazaki (city)
Gardens in Miyazaki Prefecture